Nico Weißmann (born 14 April 1980) is a German former professional footballer who played as an attacking midfielder. During his career, he represented FC Homburg, 1. FC Saarbrücken, SV Wehen, FK Pirmasens, 1. FC Kaiserslautern II and Borussia Neunkirchen.

Honours
Oberliga Südwest (V): 2009
Regionalliga West (IV): 2010

External links
 
 

Living people
1980 births
Association football midfielders
German footballers
1. FC Saarbrücken players
SV Wehen Wiesbaden players
FK Pirmasens players
1. FC Kaiserslautern II players
FC 08 Homburg players
Borussia Neunkirchen players
3. Liga players
Regionalliga players
Sportspeople from Saarbrücken